Elbert Everett "Elbie" Nickel (December 28, 1922 – February 27, 2007) was an American professional football player who was a tight end in the National Football League (NFL). He played 11 seasons for the Pittsburgh Steelers (1947–1957).

Nickel starred in three sports at the University of Cincinnati – he was an end on the football team, a top scorer on the basketball team and a pitcher-outfielder in baseball. His education was put on hold by Army service in World War II.

Generally considered one of the best tight ends in Steelers' history, Nickel recorded 329 career receptions as a tight end and is now second in career receptions by a Steelers' tight end behind Heath Miller (490). Nickel was selected to the Pro Bowl three times, 1952, 1953 and 1956.  In conjunction with the 2007 celebration of the 75th anniversary of the Steelers, Nickel was selected as one of 33 players on the Pittsburgh Steelers All-Time Team.

Elbie Nickel was selected to the Pittsburgh Steelers' Hall of Honor in 2019 along with tight end, tackle Larry Brown, coach Bill Cowher and wide receiver Hines Ward.

References

External links

1922 births
2007 deaths
People from Lewis County, Kentucky
American football tight ends
Cincinnati Bearcats football players
Cincinnati Bearcats men's basketball players
United States Army personnel of World War II
United States Army soldiers
Pittsburgh Steelers players
Eastern Conference Pro Bowl players
American men's basketball players